Çavdarlı (formerly Kıristan)  is a village in Tarsus district of Mersin Province, Turkey. It is in the southern slopes of the Taurus Mountains and to the north of Tarsus. It is situated to the northwest   of  Berdan Dam reservoir and to the south of Keşbükü creek a branch of Berdan River. The population of Çavdarlı was 343 as of 2011. But the population is on decrease because of migration to cities. Major economic activity of the village is fruit farming. Grape and olive are the main crops. Beehiving and poultry husbandry are secondary activities.

References

Villages in Tarsus District